Gazrabi (also Romanized as Gazrābī) is a village in Rezqabad Rural District, in the Central District of Esfarayen County, North Khorasan Province, Iran. At the 2006 census, its population was 59, in 15 families.

References 

Populated places in Esfarayen County